NFTY: The Reform Jewish Youth Movement (formerly known as the North American Federation for Temple Youth, often referred to simply as NFTY, commonly pronounced "nifty") is the organized youth movement of Reform Judaism in North America. Funded and supported by the Union for Reform Judaism (URJ), NFTY exists to supplement and support Reform youth groups at the synagogue level. About 750 local youth groups affiliate themselves with the organization, comprising over 8,500 youth members.

NFTY is the North American branch of Netzer Olami, the worldwide Progressive Zionist Youth movement. This relationship was formalized at the biennial NFTY Convention in Los Angeles, California in February 2005.

History
Founded on January 15, 1939 by the Union of American Hebrew Congregations (now called the Union for Reform Judaism), the then-titled National Federation of Temple Youth was a program to encourage college students to engage in synagogue life. NFTY was originally focused in three regions - New York City, Chicago, and Pennsylvania; it soon expanded to all areas of the UAHC. The first national officers were: Richard Bluestein, president; Bernard Sang, first vice president; Lewis Held, second vice president; Daniel Miller, third vice president; Lenore Cohn, secretary.  The executive committee of NFTY met in June 1939 in New York and discussed college activities, publications and social justice while also confirming cooperation with the UAHC as an affiliate and to cooperate with the National Conference for Community and Justice in interfaith work.

Rabbi Sam Cook organized one of the first regional Labor Day Conclaves of the Union of American Hebrew Congregations (UAHC) Pennsylvania State Federation, held at Pinemere Camp in 1939. The next convention was February 1940 in Chicago with former President Hoover as a Speaker. National conventions continued every two years until 1948 and the organization began to focus on High School aged students.

In the 1950s, NFTY began to focus on social action and mitzvah themes, capitalizing on the vision, ideals, and energy of teenagers to help transform the world. Local, regional, and national social action efforts were commonplace on issues from the releases of Russian Jews to the fight against poverty to hunger. Mitzvah Corps groups were established in many regions.

In 1952, NFTY began Jewish summer camping in the newly purchased facility in Oconomowoc, Wisconsin later called the Olin-Sang-Ruby Union Institute Camp (or OSRUI). In 1964, the Kutz Camp in Warwick, New York became NFTY's North American leadership camp and the site of North American board meetings. The successful Jewish camping movement expanded under the UAHC/URJ and NFTY to Jewish camps around the United States.

In 1961, NFTY began Israel programming with the URJ Heller High School (formerly Eisendrath International Exchange) semester in Israel. NFTY summer trips to Israel, often attended between sophomore and junior years of high school have been attended by thousands of Reform Jewish teenagers. Trips to Europe, mitzvah trips to locations such as Puerto Rico and Mexico, and archaeological digs have also been sponsored by NFTY in recent decades.

From 1962-1965, NFTY focused on innovation in international programming. The NFTY Summer Antiquities Tour brought NFTYites to see the sights and meet the Jewish youth of Europe and Israel. The NFTY Bible Institute provided a thorough touring experience in Israel. Mitzvah Corps programs sprung up in Puerto Rico, Israel, and Mexico, as well as in New York and Chicago. Today, almost every NFTY Region has a Mitzvah Corps Program.

In 1965, NFTY acquired a new summer address: its own national camp—the URJ Kutz Camp in Warwick, NY. Beginning that summer, Kutz became the site for NFTY’s Leadership Institutes, Board Meetings, and other national programs. It continues to be the headquarters for NFTY Leadership Training.

In 1983, NFTY reintroduced the NFTY Convention in Washington, D.C. Every other year on President's Day weekend, hundreds to thousands of Reform Jewish teenagers gather for study, prayer, music, and socializing in a major North American city. A youth advisor's professional training conference was added to run concurrently in 1999 with a youth clergy track added in 2001. Convention typically alternates between the East and West coast.

In the late 1980s at Mechina, a leadership training and policy setting gathering of the NFTY General Board, NFTY officially recognized itself as a North American movement, in response to a growing and influential Canadian population. To this day, the movement still works to get all of its membership, and more importantly, outside press to correctly identify the movement and its various events, i.e. NFTY Convention as opposed to National Convention and North American Executive and General Boards as opposed to National Board.

From the very beginning, the work of NFTY's Youth Leadership has been supported by the adult Professional Staff of NFTY and the Union for Reform Judaism. Directors of NFTY include Rabbi Samuel Cook (1945–1967), Rabbi Henry Skirball (1963–1971), Rabbi Allan Smith (1971–2002) Rabbi Michael Mellen (2005–2011).

Today, NFTY has over 450 local youth groups in 19 regions in the United States and Canada with over 150 regional events a year. Past NFTYites and NFTY leadership can be found as numerous rabbis, cantors, educators, social workers, synagogue leaders, and active Reform Jews across the world. For example, Eric Yoffie, recent President of the URJ, was a member of NFTY-Northeast and served as their regional president in 1964.

Mission
Throughout the 2014–2015 NFTY year, the Regional Presidents Network drafted a new mission statement to reflect the cohesive values, aspirations, and goals of the North American Federation of Temple Youth. This mission statement was formally adopted by the NFTY Board, General Board, and adult leadership after being presented at the 2015 NFTY Convention in Atlanta. The mission statement reads as follows:

NFTY is a movement that builds strong, welcoming, inspired communities through teen-powered engagement. Together, we pursue Tikkun Olam, personal growth, youth empowerment, and deep connections, all rooted in Reform Judaism.

Structure 
NFTY is divided into three levels: Temple Youth Group (TYG), Regional, and North American. At each level, authority is divided between elected youth boards and supervisors employed by the URJ or local synagogue. Boards vary widely between youth groups and regions, but typically include positions such as: President, Programming Vice-President, Social Action Vice-President, Religious & Cultural Vice-President, Membership Vice-President, Communications Vice-President, Treasurer, and Secretary.

TYG Level
TYGs, or Temple Youth Groups, are individual youth groups affiliated with Reform congregations and are the foundation of NFTY. TYGs are youth-run and offer participants educational, social, action, and religious programs. Most TYGs have a youth group board and an adult advisor appointed by the congregation. The youth group advisor or director is sometimes a volunteer in the congregation, a parent, a part-time staff person, or, in a small, but increasing number of synagogues, a full-time position. While the board structure is at the direction of each group, most are modeled after the regional or North American board.

Regions
NFTY is divided into nineteen regions  which hold events to bring together different TYGs based on geographical distribution. For example, NFTY-STR (Southern Tropical Region), the most populous region, includes around 30 TYGs and over 600 members.

Relations between regions range from friendly "rivalry" to "alliance" and are subject to combinations and divisions that occur due to membership fluctuation. For example:
Until 2001, NFTY-SAR and NFTY-STR comprised one region, known as NFTY-SER (formerly known as SEFTY). The regions still work together to run certain social action projects. Additionally, until 2003/2004 NFTY-NAR (New York Area Region) comprised three regions, NFTY-NYC (New York City, formerly known as CRaFTY), NFTY-LI (Long Island, formerly known as LIFTY), and NFTY-W/F (Westchester/Fairfield and parts of Connecticut, formerly known as WooFTY). Additionally, a 21st region, NFTY-Central New York (formerly known as CNFTY) existed until 1995. In that year, the Central New York region, which included synagogues along the Hudson Valley from Rockland County, N.Y., north to Albany and west to Syracuse, N.Y., was split among the Northeast region, the Northeast Lakes region, and the New Jersey region (formerly known as JFTY).

 regions are:
NFTY-CAR: Chicago Area Region
NFTY-CWR: Central West Region

Northern California, Nevada, Hawaii, and Utah.
NFTY-GER: Garden-Empire Region
Northern and Central New Jersey and parts of downstate New York.
NFTY-MAR: Mid Atlantic Region
 Maryland, the District of Columbia, Virginia, eastern West Virginia and parts of Northern North Carolina
NFTY-MI: Michigan
NFTY-MV: Missouri Valley

Illinois (except Chicago), Missouri, Iowa, Kansas, Nebraska, Colorado, and Wyoming.
NFTY-NAR: the New York metropolitan area
New York City, Westchester, Long Island, Fairfield County, Connecticut, Puerto Rico, and the US Virgin Islands
NFTY-NE: Northeast
Massachusetts, Connecticut, Vermont, New Hampshire, Rhode Island, Maine, northeastern New York, and parts of Canada.
NFTY-NEL: Northeast Lakes
Around the Great Lakes (both in the US and Canada) including parts of the states of Ohio, Pennsylvania, New York, and all of Ontario, Canada.
NFTY-NO: Northern
Minnesota, Wisconsin, Rockford, Illinois, North and South Dakota, Saskatchewan, Manitoba
NFTY-NW: Northwest
It is physically the largest region, spanning Alaska, Alberta, British Columbia, Idaho, Montana, Oregon and Washington.
NFTY-OV: Ohio Valley
Indiana, Ohio, Tennessee, Kentucky, West Virginia
NFTY-PAR: Pennsylvania Area Region
 Pennsylvania (excluding Erie, PA), Southern NJ, Delaware, and parts of West Virginia.
NFTY-SAR: Southern Area Region
North Florida, Georgia, South Carolina, Charlotte, NC, and Chattanooga, TN
NFTY-SO: Southern
Arkansas, Alabama, Louisiana, Mississippi, Western Tennessee and the Florida Panhandle.
NFTY-SoCal: Southern California
From Atascadero to San Diego
NFTY-STR: Southern Tropical Region
All of Florida outside of the panhandle, except Pensacola and the Bahamas
NFTY-SW: Southwest
Las Vegas, Arizona, New Mexico, El Paso
NFTY-TOR: Texas-Oklahoma Region
Texas and Oklahoma

Regional Leadership
Each region has an elected executive board of teens, who coordinate the efforts of temple youth groups, plan/assist regional events, improve marketing, and recruit new members. There is also an adult NFTY Regional Advisor, a paid staff position, who supervises the executive board and is a liaison with TYG advisors.

Each executive board consists of 6-10 teen members, each with a title and designated responsibilities. While each region's board is slightly different, many positions are similar across North America. Some common positions are: President, Programming Vice President, Religious & Cultural Vice President, Social Action Vice President, Membership Vice President, Communications Vice President, Financial Vice President.

North American Involvement

NFTY Board (North American Board) 
The NFTY board is elected each year to establish general policy and themes for the organization as a whole, as well as lead the various leadership networks. The board members are typically recent high school graduates, although there are occasional exceptions to this trend. The board currently consists of a President, Programming Vice-President, Social Action Vice-President, Religious & Cultural Vice-President, Engagement & Inclusion Vice-President, Communications Vice-President and Development Vice President. In 2022, Maddy Denker and Sam Goldstone pushed the NAB to create the position of Development Vice President. Riley Genevieve Miner changed the name of Membership Vice-President to Engagement & Inclusion Vice-President. 

[a]In 5774 (2014), the position of Membership & Communications Vice President was split into Membership Vice President and Communications Vice President.

[b]In 5782 (2022) the position of Membership Vice President was renamed Engagement and Inclusion Vice President.

[c]In 5782 (2022) the position of Development Vice President was created by the North American Board.

North American Gatherings 
Three North American gatherings are held: NFTY Convention (held every other year and open to all members), Mechina, and NFTY Veida, formerly known as Mid-Year Boards. Mechina, meaning preparation, is held every year for regional board members and includes a business meeting as well as networking and other activities to prepare for the coming year. Veida, held on non-convention years, is the annual business meeting for electing the incoming North American Board, selecting Study and Action Themes, and performing other business as needed. On convention years, the business of NFTY Veida is done during NFTY Convention.

Names

Originally, all NFTY regions were known by short acronyms ending in "FTY" (Federation of Temple Youth) such as LIFTY (Long Island Federation of Temple Youth) or OVFTY (Ohio Valley Federation of Temple Youth). Many synagogue youth groups had similar names based on the name of their city or synagogue.

In 1994, to create greater connection to the North American movement, the names of all NFTY regions became a two- or three- letter region specific abbreviation, preceded by "NFTY-"—thus, LIFTY became NFTY-LI, OVFTY became NFTY-OV (informally known as NFTY-(t)OV), JFTY became known as NFTY-GER (NFTY-Garden Empire Region) and PaFTY (Pennsylvania Federation of Temple Youth) became NFTY-PAR (NFTY-Pennsylvania Area Region). While resisted at first, regions adapted to the new names and sometime began to pronounce the geographic abbreviation. For example, TOFTY (Texas-Oklahoma Federation of Temple Youth) became NFTY-TOR (Texas-Oklahoma Region) and is often called simply "TOR" (pronounced tour). During the conversion, SEFTY became NFTY-SER, and then in 2001 split into two regions: NFTY-SAR (the previous Northern Region of SEFTY/NFTY-SER, plus the Jacksonville and Tallahassee TYGs) and NFTY-STR (the remainder of the Southern Region of SEFTY/NFTY-SER; STR is pronounced "star").

NFTY Convention

NFTY Convention is a biennial convention for all of the NFTY regions and includes 3 days (as of NFTY Convention 2017) of social, educational, charitable, and religious programming. The conventions also feature competitions in music, art, and oratory. Each convention is held in conjunction with the URJ Youth Workers Conference and a plenary session, or asefah, for regional board members. NFTY Convention is the largest convention of its kind.

Affiliations, Partnerships, Relationships
Union for Reform Judaism (URJ)
Netzer Olami
Reform Zionism
Association of Reform Zionists of America (ARZA)
KESHER, the college outreach arm of URJ (now defunct) 
Religious Action Center of Reform Judaism, the political/legislative outreach arm of the URJ
Hebrew Union College-Jewish Institute of Religion, the Reform Jewish seminary
World Union for Progressive Judaism

Music

In NFTY's early years, traditional Jewish and Yiddish melodies and spirituals such as "Elijah Rock" were common. In the 1950s, high school aged students sang songs composed by Hy Zaret and Lou Singer, such as "Close Your Eyes and Point Your Finger" and "It Could Be a Wonderful World," in order to promote social consciousness in young people, and learned the dance steps and music popular on Israeli kibbutzim at the time, such as the water dance ("Mayim Mayim").

In the 1960s, folk music became dominant with guitar playing teenaged song leaders leading youth in Pete Seeger, Peter, Paul & Mary, and Bob Dylan songs, among others, as well as original compositions not usually recorded for posterity. Following the Six-Day War in Israel, a surge of Zionism in Jewish life pushed Hebrew, Israeli, Chasidic, and liturgically based songs to the forefront. The "Mi Chamocha" hymn, for example, was set by NFTY participants to the melody of Bob Marley's "Redemption Song." Similarly, the traditional "Adon Olam" can be set to nearly any melody for any situation.

In 1968, Michael Isaacson introduced a NFTY Folk Service at the Kutz Camp demonstrating the growing trend of participatory, informal, mixed Hebrew/English services and song sessions that have remained the hallmark of a NFTY service. This style of American-born Jewish music came to be known as "American Nusach". The first NFTY album, Songs NFTY Sings was produced at the then-UAHC Kutz Camp. It contained eight contemporary Jewish folk pieces and 10 songs from Isaacson's Folk Service. The album, produced by Loui Dobin, now the director of Greene Family Camp, was quickly followed by 5 more albums: Shiru Shir Chadash (1973), Ten Shabbat V'Ten Shalom (Give Us Sabbath and Give Us Peace) (1974), Eit Hazmir, The Time of Singing (1977), and nfty at 40: this is very good (1980). In 1989, Fifty Years in the Making 1939–1989 was released with new music and retrospective hits. The 7 albums are often also referred to as NFTY I, NFTY II, NFTY III, and so on. In 2003 all of the original 7 albums were re-released on compact disc in a 5-disc set The Complete NFTY Recordings 1972–1989.

Beginning in 2006 NFTY has released the Ruach compilation album series at biannual conventions, featuring contemporary Jewish artists on CD, many of them former NFTYites themselves: Ruach 5761, Ruach 5763, Ruach 5765 (featuring music from and about Israel), Ruach 5767, Ruach 5769, Ruach 5771, and Ruach 5773. The series transitioned to a digital-only format in 2015. Ruach 5775 was released digitally at NFTY Convention 2015 and Ruach 5777 was released digitally at NFTY Convention 2017.

Performers popular within NFTY include Debbie Friedman, Kol B'Seder (Rabbi Danny Freelander and Cantor Jeff Klepper), Ramie and Merri Arian, Doug Mishkin, Peri Smilow, Julie Silver, Dan Nichols, Josh Nelson, Bryan Zive, Chana Rothman Noam Katz, Rick Recht, Alan Goodis,, and Jacob "Spike" Kraus.

References

External links 
NFTY: The Reform Jewish Youth Movement

Jewish youth organizations
Union for Reform Judaism
Reform Judaism outreach
Youth organizations established in 1939
Youth organizations based in the United States